Where the Action Is is a music-based television variety show that aired in the United States from 1965 to 1967.  It was carried by the ABC network and aired each weekday afternoon. Created by Dick Clark as a spin-off of American Bandstand, Where the Action Is premiered on June 28, 1965.  The show was another step in the then-current trend of entertainment programs that targeted the teenage audience by focusing on pop music, following in the footsteps of Shindig! (premiered in the fall of 1964, also on ABC) and Hullabaloo (premiered January 1965 on NBC). Dick Clark's voice could be heard doing the artist introductions, and he sometimes did filmed interviews.

Background

The show was hosted by Linda Scott and Steve Alaimo, who sang numbers between guest performances. Ms. Scott had a few hit singles as a teenager in the early 1960s; she was only 20 when "Action" premiered. Also appearing were Keith Allison (a Paul McCartney look-alike who later became a member of Paul Revere and the Raiders) and Laura Nyro. Typically, the show featured two or three performers lip-synching their recent hits with a bunch of teenagers clapping and swaying in the background, and a dance segment featuring the Action dancers.  There would occasionally be an interview segment.  A few episodes featured only one performer, such as Herman's Hermits or James Brown.

Originally intended as a summer replacement and broadcast at 2 P.M. EDT, the show was successful enough for it to continue throughout the 1965–66 TV season, with a change in time period to 4:30 P.M. Eastern time following the horror soap opera Dark Shadows. Both programs attracted a young audience who watched the shows after school.  It was in black and white.

The show's theme song, "Action", became a hit single for Freddy "Boom Boom" Cannon, peaking on the charts (#13) in September 1965. Most of these black-and-white telecasts were taped at various locales in Southern California. A handful of segments were taped elsewhere around the US. The theme song was written by Steve Venet and Tommy Boyce. Later, Boyce co-wrote songs for The Monkees.

The program had its own stable of performers, most notably Paul Revere & the Raiders, who served as the de facto house band.  Easily identified by their Revolutionary War costumes, the band had several Top 40 hits in the '60s thanks in part to the exposure they received on "Where The Action Is".  Their lead singer, Mark Lindsay, with his signature ponytail, became one of the most popular teenage idols of the decade, gracing the covers of countless teen magazines.  The Raiders also recorded the "Action" theme song for their 1965 album "Just Like Us" for which Dick Clark wrote the liner notes.  When the group departed the show in 1966, they were replaced by The Robbs and The Hard Times.  Other regular performers on Action included the dance troupe Pete Menefee and the Action Kids.  Individual episodes featured a wide range of guest performers, as detailed below.  Tina Mason was a regular singer being promoted by Dick Clark on the show. She met on the set and later married Phil Volk, the bass player for Paul Revere and the Raiders.  They married on the second anniversary of the show's premiere, June 27, 1967.

The weekday program was cancelled on March 31, 1967, with the network giving its local affiliates the time slot.  However, members of the program's mainstay band Paul Revere and the Raiders (with lead vocalist Mark Lindsay) hosted very similar follow-up shows: both Revere and Lindsay hosted Happening '68, a Saturday afternoon follow-up to American Bandstand, and a weekday version of the same show, It's Happening, from 1968 to 1969. Both shows were produced by Dick Clark's production company for ABC.

By the late 1990s, Alaimo worked in the recording industry with typeface enthusiast Jeff N. Levine, who noticed an interesting typeface spelling out the show's title on a photo album Steve kept from those years. The typeface was similar to "Caruso Roxy", a psychedelic-style typeface by Victor Caruso. Tracing the letters which existed on that page, and creating his own characters for those that were missing, the font was digitized by Brad O. Nelson of Brain Eaters Fonts and released as freeware under the name "Action Is". The font became a favorite, and was nicknamed "the Austin Powers font" after the movie and because of its quirky 60's-70's appeal. The typeface was popular throughout the 2000s, and many still use it today. The font even spawned an extension version also done by Jeff Levine, dubbed "Groovy Happening JNL", which sold well on MyFonts.

Regulars
Dick Clark (Host-Announcer. Except for a brief cameo at the beginning of the pilot and at the end of the final episode, he only appeared in off-camera voice-overs to introduce performers)
Paul Revere and The Raiders (1965-1967)
The Robbs (1966–1967)
Keith Allison
Steve Alaimo (Co-Executive Producer & Host)
Tina Mason (Temporary Replaced: 1966)
Linda Scott (Co-Hostess/Hostess: 1965-1966 & 1967)
The Action Kids (1965-1967)
The Knickerbockers (1966)
The Hard Times (1966-1967)
Don and the Goodtimes
Tommy Roe

Guest performers (partial list)
						
						
Al Martino						
Aretha Franklin						
B.J. Thomas						
Barbara Lewis						
Barbara Mason						
Barry McGuire						
Ben E. King
Bernadette Peters
Bill Cullen (The Host of "THE PRICE IS RIGHT")						
Billy Joe Royal						
Billy Preston						
Billy Stewart						
Blues Magoos						
Bob Lind						
Bobby Freeman						
Bobby Fuller Four						
Bobby Goldsboro	
Bobby Hebb	
Bobby Rydell						
Bobby Vee						
Brenda Holloway						
Brenda Lee						
Brian Hyland						
Brook Benton						
Buck Owens						
Buffalo Springfield						
Captain Beefheart						
Chad & Jeremy						
Charlie Rich						
Cher						
Chet Baker						
Chris Montez						
Danny Hutton						
Dave Dee, Dozy, Beaky, Mick and Tich
Davy Jones						
Dee Jay & The Runaways						
Dee Dee Sharp						
Del Shannon
Desi Arnaz (as "I Love Lucy's" Ricky Ricardo)						
Diane Renay						
Dick and Dee Dee
Dino, Desi & Billy						
Dionne Warwick						
Don Grady						
Donovan						
Doris Troy						
Duane Eddy						
Dusty Springfield						
Eddie Hodges						
Eddie Holman						
Edwin Starr						
Five Americans						
Frankie Avalon						
Frankie Valli & The Four Seasons						
Freddie & the Dreamers						
Freddy Cannon						
Gale Garnett						
Gary Lewis & the Playboys						
Gary U.S. Bonds						
Gene Pitney						
Glen Campbell						
Gloria Jones						
Herman's Hermits						
Ike & Tina Turner						
Jackie DeShannon						
						
Jackie Lee						
Jackie Wilson						
James Brown & The Famous Flames				
James Darren	
James Keefer 					
Jan & Dean						
Jimmie Rodgers						
Jimmy Clanton						
Jimmy Velvet						
Jo Ann Campbell						
Jody Miller						
Joe Tex						
Johnny Rivers						
Johnny Tillotson						
Jr. Walker & the All Stars						
Ketty Lester						
Patti LaBelle & the Bluebelles						
Laura Nyro						
Len Barry						
Lenny Welch						
Lesley Gore
Lesley-Marie Colburn						
Little Anthony & The Imperials						
Little Richard						
Lou Christie
Lou Rawls						
Love						
Major Lance						
Marianne Faithfull						
Martha and the Vandellas						
Marvin Gaye						
Mary Wells						
Maxine Brown
Mel Carter						
Mickey Rooney, Jr.					
Mitch Ryder & the Detroit Wheels						
Neil Sedaka						
Nino Tempo and April Stevens						
Otis Redding						
Pamela Miller						
Paul Petersen						
Percy Sledge						
Peter & Gordon						
Petula Clark			
Pinkerton's Assorted Colours			
Question Mark & the Mysterians						
Ray Peterson						
Ray Stevens
Ronnie Dove						
Rosey Grier						
Roy Clark						
Roy Head						
Roy Orbison						
Sam and Dave						
Sam the Sham & the Pharaohs						
Shadows of Knight						
Shirley Ellis						
Sir Douglas Quintet						
Smokey Robinson & The Miracles						
Sonny & Cher						
Stevie Wonder						
Strawberry Alarm Clock						
Terry Knight and the Pack	
The Action					
The Animals						
The Association
The Beatles						
The Beau Brummels						
						
The Byrds						
The Castaways						
The Classics (Classics IV)
The Cryin' Shames						
The Crystals						
The Cyrkle						
The Detergents						
The Dillards						
The Dixie Cups						
The Drifters						
The Everly Brothers						
The Fortunes
The Four Tops						
The Grass Roots						
The Happenings						
The Hondells						
The Impressions						
The Kingsmen						
The Kingston Trio						
The Kinks						
The Knickerbockers						
The Left Banke						
The Lovin' Spoonful						
The Mamas & the Papas						
The McCoys						
Wayne Fontana & the Mindbenders
The Miracles							
The Mojo Men						
The Moody Blues						
The Music Machine						
The Nashville Teens						
The Newbeats						
The Outsiders						
The Palace Guard	
The Razor’s Edge					
The Righteous Brothers	
The Rolling Stones					
The Rose Garden						
The Shangri-Las						
The Small Faces						
The Spencer Davis Group						
The Spinners
The Standells						
The Statler Brothers						
The Strangeloves						
The Sunrays						
The Supremes						
The Swingin' Medallions						
The Temptations
The 13th Floor Elevators				
The Tokens						
The Toys						
The Turtles						
The Velvelettes						
The Ventures						
The Vibrations						
The Vogues						
The Who						
The Yardbirds						
The Zombies						
Them						
Tommy Sands						
Toni Basil						
Unit 4 + 2						
Vic Dana
The Walker Brothers						
We Five
Wilson Pickett

References

External links

 

1965 American television series debuts
1967 American television series endings
1960s American music television series
1960s American variety television series
American Broadcasting Company original programming
Black-and-white American television shows
Television series by Dick Clark Productions